Apomyius, Greek for "driving away the flies," was an epithet of Zeus at Olympia. On one occasion, when Heracles was offering a sacrifice to Zeus at Olympia, he was annoyed by hosts of flies, and in order to get rid of them, he offered a sacrifice to Zeus Apomyius, whereupon the flies withdrew across the river Alpheius. From that time the Eleans sacrificed to Zeus under this name.

It was customary to sacrifice a bull to Zeus Apomyius at the ancient Olympic Games, in order to drive away the flies that plagued those events.

Notes

Epithets of Zeus